Quaker Bridge is a historic steel Pratt truss bridge located in Hempfield Township, Mercer County, Pennsylvania. It was built in 1898 by the Cleveland Bridge & Engineering Company, and is a  bridge with a single span.  It crosses Little Shenango River.

It was listed on the National Register of Historic Places in 1988.

References 

Road bridges on the National Register of Historic Places in Pennsylvania
Bridges in Mercer County, Pennsylvania
National Register of Historic Places in Mercer County, Pennsylvania
Steel bridges in the United States
Pratt truss bridges in the United States